Testis-specific basic protein Y 2 also known as basic charge, Y-linked 2 is a protein that in humans is encoded by the BPY2 gene which resides on the Y chromosome.

Function 
This gene is located in the nonrecombining portion of the Y chromosome, and expressed specifically in testis. The encoded protein interacts with ubiquitin protein ligase 
E3A and may be involved in male germ cell development and male infertility. Three nearly identical copies of this gene exist on chromosome Y; two copies are part of a palindromic region. This record represents the copy outside of the palindromic region.

References

External links

Further reading